Vince Dundee (October 22, 1907 – July 27, 1949), born Vincenzo Lazzara in Sicily, became the New York State Athletic Commission world middleweight champion when he defeated reigning champion Lou Brouillard on October 30, 1933.  His title was also recognized by the National Boxing Association (NBA). He was the younger brother of former welterweight world champion of boxing, Joe Dundee.

Early life
The Lazzara family emigrated from Sicily to the United States and lived in Baltimore. Following in the footsteps of his older brother Joe, who was a world welterweight champion, Vince changed his name to Dundee and became a professional boxer.  A third brother, Anthony, fought under the name "Battling Dundee", but never contended for a title.

Professional career
Dundee began his formal professional boxing career in 1927.  He lived and boxed for a period in Belleville, New Jersey, where he was managed by Max Waxman, who also managed brother Joe.  Vince was trained by Benny Benjamin, another Baltimore resident, and later by Heinie Blaustein.

Willie Harmon fell to Dundee on August 1, 1927, in a ten-round points decision in Baltimore.

Dundee first lost to reigning world welterweight champion, the incomparable Jackie Fields on October 2, 1929, in a ten-round points decision before a crowd of 7,000 in Chicago.  In a somewhat close and furiously fought contest, Fields employed the cleaner punching and scored a knockdown with a right cross in the sixth to gain the decision of the judges.  The remainder of the bout saw a furious and constant exchange of blows as both boxers worked for a knockout.  In their second meeting, Fields on January 24, 1930, Fields won more convincingly in a ten-round unanimous decision at Chicago Stadium.  Fields floored Dundee four times in the third, the first three times for eight counts, and a brief two count when Dundee was saved by the closing bell.  The young Dundee recovered in the fifth round, and appeared to have even taken the tenth.  The fighting was constant with rallies in seven of the ten rounds, each ending in exhausted clinches.

During several important boxing bouts in Europe, Marcel Thil, French welterweight champion decisively defeated Dundee on March 12, 1931, in a twelve-round unanimous decision before an impressive crowd of 14,000.   After an even first round, the faster Thil took the next three, and held his own gaining additional points in the remaining rounds. Two weeks later, Dundee drew with British welterweight champion Jack Hood in ten rounds in White City, England.  The bout was slow and calculated, though Dundee scored occasionally against the mid-section, and Hood connected with long lefts to Dundee's head.

Dundee defeated future NBA world middleweight champion Solly Krieger on October 16, 1931, in an eighth-round technical knockout at Madison Square Garden, though there was no great degree of crowd interest in the semi-final bout.

Dundee drew with Ben Jeby to on March 17, 1933, in his first attempt at the New York State Athletic Commission's (NYSAC) world middleweight title in fifteen rounds before 11,000 at Madison Square Garden.  Ed Hughes of the Brooklyn Daily Eagle wrote that Dundee clearly deserved the decision and believed he won eleven of the fifteen rounds, with only three to Jeby, but one judge ruled for Jeby, and the referee ruled for a draw.  Hughes wrote that from the third round on, Dundee connected with left jabs with enough frequency to gain the decision, though Jeby likely took the fifth and seventh.  In a rough bout, Jeby's face looked badly beaten.  The Associated Press, agreeing that Dundee deserved the decision, gave him nine rounds with Jeby four and two even.  Dundee blocked so well from the sixth to the final round, that Jeby landed very few solid punches.

Taking the world middleweight title, October, 1933

On October 30, 1933, after six years in the professional ring, Dundee defeated Lou Brouillard over 15 rounds before 9,330 in Boston to capture the New York State Athletic Commission's (NYSAC) world middleweight title. Dundee side-stepped most of Brouillard's savage rushes and countered repeatedly with rights to the head, in a close decision. Dundee managed to take eight rounds, but most of his scored points were from calculated blows, and there were no knockdowns in the bout. Brouillard had difficulty penetrating the defenses of Dundee, and could only score consistently with brief attacks to the body.  Brouillard, though a 3-1 favorite, had difficulty with the skilled scientific boxing and calculated defense of Dundee.  Brouillard claimed fatigue in making the 160 pound weight limit was the cause of his loss, but Dundee opened up well by the last round, and stung Brouillard with both lefts and rights that clinched his scoring margin, and likely had an effect. In the early rounds, Dundee danced for position and strategically landed left jabs to Brouillard's face that piled up points and kept his opponent at a distance.

Dundee defended his world middleweight title on December 8, 1933, against southpaw Andy Callahan, winning in a fifteen-round split decision against Andy Callahan before 11,200 in Boston.  Dundee dominated the last five rounds, though Callahan frequently tried to force the fighting which was particularly close in the first ten rounds.  The Boston Globe gave Dundee nine rounds with only the first, seventh, eighth, and ninth to Callahan.  Dundee fought with both a four-inch height advantage, and a not insignificant advantage in reach.  Callahan scored in the first two thirds of the bout with hard rights and harder lefts to the head and body before tiring in the ninth.  Callahan landed a few solid blows with his left, which he also led with, but had difficulty connecting with his right.

Dundee defeated French-Canadian boxer Al McCoy on March 22, 1934, in a ten-round unanimous decision in Boston.  Dundee won decisively, though he took a beating during a strong display of offense by McCoy in the first three rounds.

Before a crowd of 8,000, Dundee mounted his second successful defense of the world middleweight title against Al Diamond on May 3, 1934, in Paterson, New Jersey, winning in a fifteen-round points decision.  The referee gave eleven rounds of the decisive win to Dundee with only the third to Diamond. Aiming for the body and delivering a strong right to Diamond's left side through most of the bout, Dundee hammered away, particularly when the two were close.

Losing the world middleweight title, September, 1934
Dundee lost his claim to the middleweight crown when he was outpointed by Teddy Yarosz in a fifteen-round decision on September 11, 1934, before a crowd of 28,000 at Forbes Field in Pittsburgh.  The bout was close but somewhat dull due to too much wrestling and clinching, though Yarosz seemed to hold the lead in all but the late rounds when he looked visibly exhausted.  Yarosz was awarded eight rounds to Dundee's four, with three even.  He scored well with long range blows to the head of Dundee, who seemed to focus more on Yarosz's midsection.  Dundee was down three times during the bout, once falling out of the ropes in round three.

Dundee defeated Babe Risko on January 25, 1935, in a close ten round split decision at Madison Square Garden. The fight was originally declared a victory for Sisko, with Judge Sidney Scharlin and referee Jed Gahan voting in favor of Sisko and the other judge, Jack Britton, voting in favor of Dundee. State athletic commissioner John J. Phelan, who was sitting at ringside, immediately performed an inspection of the ballots and found that Britton gave seven to Dundee and three to Risko and Scharlin scored five rounds for Dundee with four to Risko. Phelan, fellow commissioner Bill Brown, and Scharlin conferred and the decision was reversed in favor of Dundee. The Associated Press gave six rounds to Dundee and four to Risko. Risko rallied in the last few rounds, but Dundee's more sustained aggressiveness and frequent blows to the body gave him the decision on points.

Dundee lost to Freddie Steele on July 30, 1935, in a brutal third-round technical knockout.  Dundee was down eleven times in the bout, before the referee stopped the match.  He was hospitalized at Seattle's Providence Hospital, after sustaining a slight concussion and a jaw broken in three places on the left side.  Dundee was down four times in the first, three times in the second, and three times in the third.  Only fifty seconds into the first round, Dundee was down for a nine count from a left to the point of his jaw.  His second trip to the canvas was also from a blow to the jaw, and also for a count of nine. Steele had lost only four times by decision in his previous 72 fights.

Dundee retired with a record of 118 wins (28 knockouts), 20 losses and 13 draws.

Life after boxing
Dundee survived a collision with a train that hurled his automobile several hundred feet not long after his boxing career ended.  He later was stricken with Multiple Sclerosis in 1942.

Death
Dundee died at a Glendale, California sanitarium in 1949 of Multiple Sclerosis, after being diagnosed with the disease five years earlier. He had been confined to the sanitarium for seven years.  He was survived by his wife, Connie; son, Vince Jr.; and father, Luigi Lazzara of Baltimore, Maryland.

Professional boxing record
All information in this section is derived from BoxRec, unless otherwise stated.

Official record

All newspaper decisions are officially regarded as “no decision” bouts and are not counted in the win/loss/draw column.

Unofficial record

Record with the inclusion of newspaper decisions in the win/loss/draw column.

References

External links 

|-

|-

1907 births
1949 deaths
American people of Italian descent
Italian emigrants to the United States
Middleweight boxers
World middleweight boxing champions
American male boxers
Boxers from Baltimore
Sportspeople from Palermo